Catherine Fleming Bruce is an American author, preservationist, activist and politician of the Democratic Party.

Early life and education 
Catherine Fleming Bruce was born in Kentucky and later moved to Columbia, South Carolina, where she was raised. Bruce received her bachelor's degree from Agnes Scott College in Decatur, Georgia and her master's degree in Journalism and Mass Communication from the University of South Carolina in Columbia. Bruce is the daughter of Emma Fleming and the late Louis Fleming, who served as Chairman of Sumter (SC) County Council.

Political activism 
Bruce has advocated in coalition with other local and state chapters of national advocacy groups and community based groups. She has been active in the preservation of Richland County (SC) historic sites in connected to local leaders active during the Civil Rights Movement, particularly Black women. In 1995, Bruce founded the Collaborative for Community Trust, which by 2000 was a "small group made up of mostly educators who are committed to social change." The group bought the home of activist Modjeska Simkins in downtown Columbia so that it could be used as a human rights center and the group's offices after restoration. Scholars noted in 2021 that Richland County has more monuments to Black women than any other county in the United States.

In the aftermath of the 2014 deadly Christmas Eve EF3 hurricane in Columbia, Mississippi and the 1000 year flood that struck Columbia, South Carolina the year afterward. Bruce highlighted historic ties between the two cities and participated in joint relief efforts that connected them as sister cities.

On January 17, 2022, Martin Luther King Day, Bruce announced her campaign to run in the 2022 election for South Carolina's Class 3 seat in the United States Senate against Republican incumbent Tim Scott. Bruce received the highest number of votes in the June 14 Democratic Primary against two opponents. Because South Carolina State law requires a more than 50% margin of victory, a June 28 runoff was held. The eventual Democratic nominee was defeated by the incumbent. Bruce is now serving as Director of Operations at Richland County Democratic Party.

Publications 
Her writings focus on culture and social justice. Published scholarship includes The Globalization-friendly global public sphere: contrasting paths to moral legitimacy and accountability, a chapter that appeared in the book, The Public Sphere Reconsidered.

Bruce's 1992 documentary, A Perfect Equality: Conflicts And Achievements of Historic Black Columbia, was broadcast on South Carolina Educational Television. The 90-minute documentary is divided into four parts, each covering an era of Black history between 1786 until 1990, and contains narration, archival photographs, and interviews. The State staff writer Pat Berman wrote that in the documentary, "Bruce focuses on what [black people] have achieved in Columbia and what strategies have been devised to deal with the racism that not only impedes progress but also denies the humanity of others". She also produced a guide to places in Richland County important to Black history that was described by The State in 1995 as a "ground-breaking guide to Columbia's black history".

Bruce is the author of The Sustainers: Being, Building and Doing Good through Activism in the Sacred Spaces of Civil Rights, Human Rights and Social Movements. She became the first African American to win the University of Mary Washington Center for Historic Preservation Book Prize in 2017. The book received significant attention in the field, and has amplified national scholarly and professional discussion on social justice, inclusion, diversity and anti-racism in the practice of preservation, as well as connections between preservation, activism and social justice.

In 2021, an article by Bruce, "A Lion Tells Her Own Story: Civil Rights Buildings in South Carolina”, was published in C20: The Magazine of the Twentieth Century Society, a United Kingdom - based publication.

References

External links 
 

Living people
South Carolina Democrats
Candidates in the 2022 United States Senate elections
Agnes Scott College alumni
University of South Carolina alumni
Historical preservationists
21st-century American women politicians
21st-century American politicians
Year of birth missing (living people)